General Sunith Francis Rodrigues, PVSM, VSM (19 September 1933 – 4 March 2022) was an Indian army officer who was Chief of the Army Staff of the Indian Army from 1990 to 1993 and Governor of Punjab from 2004 to 2010.

Early life and education
Rodrigues was born in Bombay in 1933. He was educated at St. Xavier's High School, Fort in Bombay.

Military service
Rodrigues joined the Joint Services Wing of the Indian Military Academy in 1949 and was commissioned on 28 December 1952 into the Regiment of Artillery. After serving in several field and self-propelled artillery units he applied for pilot training in the Air Observation Post of the Artillery in 1964 and qualified as an artillery aviation pilot. Between 1964 and 1969, he logged more than 158 flying hours on observation aircraft and helicopters, including 65 hours of combat flying during the 1965 war in which his unit logged on more than 56 precision artillery fire to effect on enemy formations.

He attended the Defence Services Staff College and took over as GSO II operations in XXXIII Corps HQ in 1971. In 1972, after the war with Pakistan, he was awarded the VSM for distinguished service. He later served as a GSO I operations of a division from 1973 to 1975.

As a Brigadier, he commanded a mountain infantry brigade in a high altitude sector from 1975 to 1977. Post this, Rodrigues attended the 1978 course at Royal College of Defence Studies in the United Kingdom. He was Chief Instructor at Defence Services Staff College from 1979 to November 1981.

General officer
Rodrigues was then promoted to the rank of Major General and then took over the command of a division in a high altitude area. In 1982, he was awarded the master's degree in Defence Studies. He then served as the Chief of Staff of a Corps from 1983 to September 1985 after which he took over as Director General Military Training (DGMT).

After promotion to the rank of Lieutenant General, Rodrigues took command of a corps in the Northern Sector in 1986.

He was Vice Chief of Army Staff from November 1987 to April 1989 and then General Officer Commanding-in-Chief of Central Command from April 1989 to October 1989. He then took over Western Command from 1 November 1989 to 30 June 1990 and was the Chief of Army Staff from 1990 to 1993. He retired on 30 June 1993 after nearly 41 years of service.

Public service
After his retirement Rodrigues was Director of the International Centre, Goa for nearly six years. He served two terms on the National Security Advisory Board. Since his retirement, he has been engaged in social and literary pursuits and has also delivered talks on strategic issues. He takes a keen interest in education and empowering children to achieve their potential. He was on the Executive Council of Goa University for seven years and on the Managing Committee of the Goa Chamber of Commerce. He is also a long-standing Member of the Goa Planning Board and on the Board of Governors of the Goa Institute of Management.

Governor of Punjab
Rodrigues was appointed Governor of Punjab and Administrator of the Union Territory of Chandigarh on 8 November 2004, and he was sworn into office on 16 November 2004.

He was succeeded by Shivraj Patil on 22 January 2010.

Death
Rodrigues died at the Manipal Hospital in Dona Paula on 4 March 2022, at the age of 88.

Military awards and decorations

Dates of rank

References 

1933 births
2022 deaths
Chiefs of Army Staff (India)
Vice Chiefs of Army Staff (India)
Goan Catholics
Military personnel from Mumbai
Konkani people
Governors of Punjab, India
Recipients of the Param Vishisht Seva Medal
Indian Roman Catholics
Indian generals
Graduates of the Royal College of Defence Studies
Recipients of the Vishisht Seva Medal
Academic staff of the Defence Services Staff College
Defence Services Staff College alumni